Medwin Hughes DL DPhil DPS FRSA FLSW is the Vice-Chancellor of the University of Wales Trinity Saint David  and of the University of Wales. He was previously principal of Trinity University College, Carmarthen and Vice-Chancellor of the University of Wales, Lampeter.

Hughes studied at University College of Wales, Aberystwyth and Jesus College, Oxford. He earned his doctorate in the Faculty of Medieval and Modern Languages and Literature in 1987, for his thesis entitled "Studies in Calvinistic Methodist Welsh Literature, 1790-1825".

In October 2011, Hughes became Vice-Chancellor of the University of Wales amid scandal regarding the university's overseas validation process.

In 2017, he chaired the Independent Review of Support for Publishing and Literature in Wales report to the Senedd.

In 2021 he was appointed as chair of the Representative Body of the Church in Wales.

Publications
 Medwin Hughes (1987) Ceiriog a'r traddodiad telynegol, Taliesin, 59 (1987), p. 62-69. 
 Medwin Hughes (1988) Llyfr y Tri Aderyn : agweddau teipolegol, Transactions of the Honourable Society of Cymmrodorion, (1988), p. 47-58.
 Medwin Hughes (1989) Llwybrau (Dinbych : Gwasg Gee) (novel)
 Medwin Hughes (1989) Llythyrau William Erbery,  Cylchgrawn Llyfrgell Genedlaethol Cymru, 1989-07-01, Vol.26 (1), p. 17
 Medwin Hughes (1991) Idiom lwythol y llenor Piwritanaidd, Diwinyddiaeth, Rhif 42 (1991), p. 41-62. 
 Medwin Hughes (1992) Mythau hanes 'Drych y Prif Oesoedd', Traethodydd (Denbigh, Wales), Cyf. 147 (1992), p. 89-95.
 Medwin Hughes (1993) Cerddi hir Pantycelyn : cerddi diwinyddiaeth hanes, Llên Cymru, Cyf. 17 (1993), t. 239-253.
 Medwin Hughes (1996) Citizenship 2000: Promoting the European Dimension, Evaluation & Research in Education, 10:2, 128-146, DOI: 10.1080/09500799608666911
 Glyn E. Jones, Medwin Hughes, Delyth Jones (1996) Y lefel drothwy : ar gyfer y Gymraeg (Strasbourg : Gwasg Cyngor Ewrop)
 Medwin Hughes (ed.) (1992) The Challenge of Diversity: Primary case studies (CAA Cymru, 1 Jan. 1992)
 Medwin Hughes (ed.) (1993) Blodeugerdd barddas o gerddi crefyddol (Cyhoeddiadau Barddas)
 Medwin Hughes (ed.) (1993) Saunders Lewis y bardd (Gwasg Gee, Dinbych)

References

Living people
People associated with the University of Wales
People associated with University of Wales Trinity Saint David
Alumni of Jesus College, Oxford
Alumni of Aberystwyth University
Welsh scholars and academics
Deputy Lieutenants of Dyfed
People associated with Trinity University College
People associated with the University of Wales, Lampeter
British academic administrators
Vice-Chancellors of the University of Wales
Year of birth missing (living people)